When Friendship Kills (also released as A Secret Between Friends: A Moment of Truth Movie) is a 1996 American made-for-television drama film directed by James A. Contner. The movie is a part of the Moment of Truth franchise and deals with the danger of anorexia nervosa among teens.

Plot
Lexi Archer is a teenager who, after the divorce of her parents, moves with her mother Kathryn and younger sister Jill from Chicago to Seattle. At her new school, she befriends Jennifer Harnsberger, a popular straight A student whom she meets during volleyball tryouts. After her volleyball coach suggests that Lexi should lose a few pounds in order to enhance her athletic performance, she starts to look for ways to diet. When Jennifer admits to being bulimic, they decide to diet and work out together.

Kathryn notices that her daughter is eating less and becoming thinner, but she is too occupied with her divorce to realize there is a problem. Lexi becomes adept at hiding the true nature of her eating habits. Meanwhile, Lexi and Jill visit their father in Chicago and try to convince him to reunite with Kathryn, but they soon discover that he is dating a new woman, Jolene.

Kathryn begins to suspect an eating disorder when she finds out that Lexi has not had her period in over three months. She consults a gynaecologist, but she tells her that Lexi is at a normal weight. She attributes Lexi's weight loss to the trauma of the divorce. Lexi appeared to weigh more at the doctor's because she clandestinely placed eight bundles of coins on her body to make her appear to be heavier.

Meanwhile, she and Jennifer consider being models. They are excited to be contacted by Nick McKay, a photographer, but he is interested only in Jennifer and explains that Lexi is not fit to be a model. Upset, she starts to diet even more and she eventually collapses during a volleyball match. She is hospitalized, diagnosed with anorexia nervosa and is forced to enter a recovery program.

Her parents have different opinions about her treatment and start to argue. Nevertheless, she eventually recovers and is released. She admits to her mother that Jennifer has an eating disorder as well, and a worried Kathryn immediately informs Jennifer's mother. Although Pamela dismisses the possibility of her daughter having such a condition, Jennifer feels betrayed when she hears about it and refuses to speak to Lexi, for which she blames her mother. Lexi tries to confront her at a party, but a drunken Jennifer angrily leaves, only to be hit by a car. She is taken to a hospital and dies of a cardiac arrest.

Lexi has trouble dealing with her friend's death and relapses with her eating disorder. Devastated, her mother tries to help her, assuring her that Jennifer's death can't be blamed on her. Her father wants her to be hospitalized again, but Kathryn insists she can help Lexi herself. He is successful in getting a court order to hospitalize her, but Lexi is in the end able to recover on her own, encouraged by her mother.

The film ends as Lexi participates in a volleyball match, where she sees Jen's spirit who smiles at her, and she wins the match.

Cast
 Lynda Carter as Kathryn Archer
 Katie Wright as Alexis 'Lexi' Archer
 Marley Shelton as Jennifer 'Jen' Harnsberger
 Josh Taylor as Peter Archer
Colleen Winton as Pamela Harnsberger
Kimberley Warnat as Jill Archer
Malcolm Stewart as Mr. Harnsberger
 Kevin McNulty as Ted
 Ryan Reynolds as Ben Colson
 Tobias Mehler as Justin Phelps
 Lochlyn Munro as Nick McKay

References

External links

1996 television films
1996 drama films
1996 films
American drama television films
NBC network original films
Films about eating disorders
Television shows about eating disorders
Body image in popular culture
Films directed by James A. Contner
1990s American films
1990s English-language films